Population shifts in Israel after 1948 refers to the movement of Jewish and Arab populations in the wake of Israeli independence and the outbreak of the 1948 War. Arab villagers who resettled in other locations in Israel after 1948 are often referred to as internally displaced Palestinians. Many fled during the war but later returned to their homes. The Palestinians say that Israelis drove them from out while Israel says most left of their own accord. From 1948 to 1951, mass immigration nearly doubled Israel's Jewish population.

Arab population shifts
Ein Rafa Populated by Palestinians from Suba now Tzova.
Ein Hawd Populated by Palestinians from Ein Hod.
Ramla  Populated by some Palestinians from Ashdod.
Shfaram Populated by Palestinians from the Galilee.
Ein Karem Populated by one Palestinian Christian family from Bassa village.
Nazareth More than half the population is made up of internal refugees, some of them Christian Palestinians from Safed, Baysan and Tiberias.
Umm al-Fahm
Jish Some of the Population came from the Christian Palestinian villages of Iqrit and Kafr Bir'im.
Rameh Some of the Population came from the Christian Palestinian villages of Iqrit.
Tuba-Zangariyye Some of the population, or perhaps all, from Arab Tuba and Arab Zangaria moved to this location after 1948. Some members of Mansurat el Kheit may have also ended up here.
 Harish- In 1996 about 70 Arabs were relocated from Ramle.

Jewish population shifts
Gush Etzion  comprised four Jewish villages established south of Jerusalem in the 1920s. The populations of Kfar Etzion, Massu'ot Yitzhak, Ein Tzurim and Revadim were displaced.
Beit Eshel
Beit Yosef
Hartuv (destroyed and rebuilt after the war as Moshav Naham)
Kfar Uria (destroyed and rebuilt after the war)
Mishmar HaYarden
Nirim (destroyed and rebuilt after the war in another location)
Nitzanim (destroyed and rebuilt after the war in another location)
Atarot
Beit HaArava
Kalia
Neve Yaakov
 Gush Katif
 Migron

See also
Depopulated Palestinian locations in Israel
List of villages depopulated during the Arab-Israeli conflict

References

External links
Normalization under Conflict? Spatial and Demographic Changes of Arabs in Haifa, 1948-1992
The Myth of Jewish "Colonialism": Demographics and Development in Palestine

 
Lists of populated places in Israel
Lists of populated places
Jewish villages depopulated during the 1948 Arab–Israeli War